Docter is a surname. Notable people with the surname include:

Pete Docter (born 1968), American film director, animator, screenwriter, and producer
Mary Docter (born 1961), American speed skater
Sarah Docter (born 1964), American speed skater
Tijn Docter (born 1972), Dutch actor